Cremastobombycia morogorene is a moth of the family Gracillariidae. It is found in Tanzania in savannah vegetation with agricultural farms.

The length of the forewings is 2.25 mm. The forewing ground colour is reddish ochreous with white/blackish fuscous markings. The hindwings are greyish with a long fuscous fringe. Adults are on wing in late August.

Etymology
The species name refers to the name of the type locality: Morogoro in Tanzania.

References

Endemic fauna of Tanzania
Moths described in 2012
Lithocolletinae
Insects of Tanzania
Moths of Africa

Taxa named by Jurate de Prins